Paradise is the fourth studio album by Canadian punk rock band White Lung. It was released on April 6, 2016. It was produced by Lars Stalfors, who has also produced HEALTH and the Cold War Kids.

Critical reception

According to review aggregator Metacritic, Paradise has a weighted average of 79 out of 100 based on 25 reviews, indicating "generally favorable reviews".

Consequence of Sound reviewer Dusty Henry described the album as the band's "boldest statement yet". Pitchfork described the album as "more outspoken, more anthemic" than their previous album. NME said: "White Lung have somewhat softened their ragged edges and in doing so have created one of the most compelling albums of the year". AllMusic described the album as a "dynamic, purposeful work by a band coming into its own". The Observers review noted that the album sounds "positively slowcore compared to their earlier work" but nonetheless remarked that "much of Paradise races past in an alluring blur of distortion and melody". The A.V. Club said the band "stretch the seams of punk" with this album. The Brooklyn Vegan named Paradise the number one new album of the week. Drowned in Sound describe it as an "altogether more composed and melodic album".

Alternately, Under The Radar reviewer Ed McMenamin claimed "The band say they wanted to sound "2016" on Paradise, and to vanquish the threadbare-yet-complimentary references (L7, Babes in Toyland, etc.) critics favored when describing the first three LPs. White Lung, admirably, didn't want to just make another classic rock album like so many of its reform-punk peers. Instead, Paradise sounds contemporary in the worst way, instantly dated and likely soon forgotten by any new audience the band might find."

Accolades

Track listing

Personnel
Credits adapted from the liner notes of Paradise.

White Lung
 Mish Barber-Way – vocals
 Kenneth William – guitar, bass
 Anne-Marie Vassiliou – drums

Production
 Lars Stalfors – production, engineering, mixing
 Steven Aguilar – engineering assistant
 Joe LaPorta – mastering

Artwork
 Justin Gradin – artwork, photography 
 Piper Ferguson – photography 
 Barber-Way's Mother – photography

References

External links
Paradise at Bandcamp
Paradise at Domino

2016 albums
Domino Recording Company albums
White Lung albums
Albums produced by Lars Stalfors